Trimper is a surname. Notable people with the surname include:

 Perry Trimper, Canadian politician
 Steve Trimper, American baseball coach
 Tim Trimper (born 1958), Canadian ice hockey player

See also
 Trimper's Rides
 Trimper's Haunted House